Viktorija may refer to:
 Viktorija (given name), including a list of people with this name
 Viktorija (singer), Serbian singer

See also
 Viktoriya
 Viktoria (disambiguation)
 Victoria (disambiguation)
 Viktor (disambiguation)
 Victor (disambiguation)